The Embassy of the United States in Athens is the embassy of the United States in Greece, in the capital city of Athens. The embassy is charged with diplomacy and Greece–United States relations. The United States Ambassador to Greece is the head of mission of the United States to Greece.

George James Tsunis is currently the United States Ambassador.

Facilities
The chancery building in Athens was designed by famed Bauhaus architect Walter Gropius with consulting architect Pericles A. Sakellarios. It was constructed between 1959 and 1961 and is a protected architectural landmark. Gropius' famous design was in the characteristic simple Bauhaus form, inspired by the architecture of the Parthenon.

In 2003, the U.S. Embassy and the Athens Municipality celebrated the addition of a welcoming green space, the Makedonon Street Park. The landscaping of this pedestrian walkway was prompted by heightened security requirements.

A 2007 expansion added an office building, parking garage, compound entrances, fuel station, Marine Corps Security Guard quarters, swimming pool, and basketball court. The design of the new office building is intended to integrate well with the chancery, as well as with the adjacent Megaron Mousikis (Athens Concert Hall). The new office building enabled the embassy to bring onto the compound employees who have been working in leased space for many years.

In September 2018, the embassy began a multi-year renovation that will provide additional office space and upgrade electrical and mechanical systems. The work is expected to cost $342 million and take four years to complete.  Many of the components date to the building's construction in 1961.

Offices and sections include:
Ambassador
Deputy Chief of Mission
Political Section
Economic Section
Consular Section (Visa and American citizen services; federal benefits)
Public Affairs Section (Press Office, Cultural Office, Information Resource Center)
United States Commercial Service
Foreign Agricultural Service
The Office of Defense Cooperation
U.S. Immigration and Customs Enforcement and Citizenship and Immigrations Services

Terrorism
Also see Revolutionary Organization 17 November
A minor terrorist attack occurred in the early morning of January 12, 2007. No casualties were reported. A rocket-propelled grenade Wasp 58 was fired into the embassy's modern, glass-fronted building. The Greek public order minister, Byron Polydoras, said an anonymous phone call claiming to be from the left-wing terror group Revolutionary Struggle had taken responsibility.  On January 25, 2007, Revolutionary Struggle announced in local news outlets they took responsibility for the attack.  On March 20, the Government of Greece and the United States Rewards for Justice Program announced equal, parallel rewards for information leading to the perpetrators – Greece offering 800,000 Euros and the US "up to $1 million or more".

The embassy was previously attacked by the Marxist Revolutionary Organization 17 November group on February 15, 1996, when an anti-tank missile hit the embassy's parking lot wall.

See also
United States Ambassador to Greece
List of embassy attacks
Revolutionary Struggle
Revolutionary Organization 17 November
Consulate General of the United States in Thessaloniki

References

External links
Official website
Mosaiko.gr, US Embassy in Athens e-Magazine

Walter Gropius buildings
Government buildings completed in 1961
Athens
Terrorist incidents in Greece
Greece–United States relations
United States
Register of Culturally Significant Property
Attacks on diplomatic missions of the United States
United States
Communist terrorism
Terrorist incidents in Europe in 2007
Terrorist incidents in Greece in the 2000s
2007 crimes in Greece
1961 establishments in Greece